The Ghost and the Tout also known as Ghost and the Tout is a 2018 Nigerian ghost film, written and directed by Charles Uwagbai. The film stars Sambasa Nzeribe, Toyin Abraham, Rachael Okonkwo and Omowumi Dada in the lead roles. The film had its theatrical release in Nigeria on 11 May 2018 and received positive reviews from the critics.

The film became a huge box office success grossing 30 million within one week and remained as the fifth highest grossing Nigerian film in 2018. The film still occupies the 25th position in the overall list of highest grossing films in Nigeria. The movie streams on Netflix.

Plot 
The plot of the film revolves around a young woman from the ghetto who is called Isila (Toyin Abraham). She encounters a ghost called Mike (Sambasa Nzeribe), who is in need of her assistance to communicate with the people he left behind. At the ghost's request, she becomes tangled and puzzled in solving a murder mystery and her life takes an interesting turn. Only she knows and understands what would happen in the future.

Cast 

 Sambasa Nzeribe as ghost (Mike)
 Toyin Abraham as Isila
 Rachael Okonkwo
 Ronke Ojo
 Chioma Chukwuka
 Lasisi Elenu
 Chioma Omeruah
 Dele Odule
 Chiwetalu Agu
 Femi Adebayo
 Omowumi Dada
 Princess Oyebo
 Bayray McNwizu
 Jumoke George

Box Office 
The Ghost And The Tout grossed ₦ 30 million after 1 week in cinemas and ₦ 77 million overall.

Sequel 
The sequel, The Ghost And The Tout Too was released on September 5, 2021 and premiered on Netflix on July 15, 2022.

References

External links
 

2018 films
2010s ghost films
English-language Nigerian films
2010s English-language films
Nigerian comedy-drama films